Kamila Chudzik (born 12 September 1986 in Kielce) is a retired Polish heptathlete. She won a bronze medal at the Berlin World Championship in August 2009. That success was followed by a series of injuries which effectively ended her career. She officially retired in 2015.

Competition record

Personal bests
Outdoor
200 metres – 24.33 (-0.2 m/s) (Berlin 2009)
800 metres – 2:17.41 (Zielona Góra 2008)
100 metres hurdles – 13.46 (+0.8 m/s) (Zielona Góra 2008)
High jump – 1.81 m (Toruń 2007)
Long jump – 6.55 m (+1.1 m/s) (Bydgoszcz 2009)
Shot put – 15.10 m (Berlin 2009)
Javelin throw – 55.15 m (Zielona Góra 2008)
Heptathlon – 6494 pts (Zielona Góra 2008)

Indoor
800 metres – 2:20.85  (Spała 2008)
60 metres hurdles – 8.43 (Turin 2009)
High jump – 1.71 m  (Turin 2009)
Long jump – 6.40 m  (Spała 2008)
Shot put – 15.28 m  (Spała 2008)
Pentathlon – 4537 pts  (Spała 2008)

Awards
For her sport achievements, she received:
 Golden Cross of Merit in 2009.

Notes

External links
 

1986 births
Living people
Polish heptathletes
Athletes (track and field) at the 2008 Summer Olympics
Olympic athletes of Poland
Sportspeople from Kielce
Recipients of the Gold Cross of Merit (Poland)
World Athletics Championships medalists
21st-century Polish women